Joan Kennedy (born in Douglas Harbour, New Brunswick, Canada) is a country music singer. She came to fame after winning the Canadian National Talent Contest in 1983 and issued her first album, I'm a Big Girl Now, the following year in 1984. After two more albums in 1985 and 1987, she signed with MCA Records and issued two albums, 1990's Candle in the Window and 1992's Higher Ground. In 2000, Kennedy released A Dozen Red Roses, a greatest hits album. During the early 1990s, she had her own syndicated weekly television show in Canada. She now resides in Portland, Maine.

Discography

Albums

Singles

Music videos

External links
 

Canadian women country singers
People from York County, New Brunswick
Musicians from New Brunswick
Living people
Year of birth missing (living people)